La Otra ("The Other" (feminine)), sometimes screened with the title The Other One, is a 1945 Mexican drama film directed by Roberto Gavaldón and starring Dolores del Río. The film was remade in 1964 as Dead Ringer, with Bette Davis.

Plot

At a Christmas party, María Méndez (Dolores del Río) learns that Magdalena, her twin sister, has a comfortable lifestyle. Maria kills her sister and assumes her identity and lifestyle. However, her life becomes complicated by her late sister's sleazy boyfriend Fernando (Víctor Junco), and by Roberto (Agustín Irusta), who loved the "dead" María.

Production
It was shot at the Churubusco Studios in Mexico City.

The 96-page script was originally titled "The Other Woman" by José Revueltas, Jack Wagner and Roberto Gavaldón from a story by Ryan James. The Paul Kohler Agency represented the screenwriters.

Cast
 Dolores del Río as María and Magdalena Méndez
 Víctor Junco Fernando
 Agustín Irusta as Roberto Gonzalez
 José Baviera as Sgt. De La Fuente
 Manuel Dondé as agente Vilar
 Conchita Carraced as Carmela

Other versions

The script for La Otra was owned by Warner Bros. and is the same script as the 1964 version, Dead Ringer (1964), starring Bette Davis.

References

External links

1940s thriller films
1945 films
Films about twin sisters
Mexican black-and-white films
1940s Spanish-language films
Mexican thriller films
1940s Mexican films